Bulgaria–India relations (Bulgarian: Българо-индийските отношения; Hindi: बुल्गारिया-भारत संबंध) are the international relations that exist between the Republic of Bulgaria and the Republic of India.

Bulgaria has an embassy in New Delhi and honorary consulates in Hyderabad, Kolkata and Mumbai. The embassy is jointly accredited to Bangladesh, Nepal, Sri Lanka, the Maldives and Bhutan, and also observes the South Asian Association for Regional Cooperation (SAARC). India has an embassy in Sofia, that is also jointly accredited to Macedonia.

In mid-1954, preliminary negotiations were held between Bulgaria and India in Moscow, and diplomatic relations were established in December 1954.

Bulgaria opened a diplomatic mission (Legation) in New Delhi in April 1955. The mission was re-organized into an embassy in March 1961. India's diplomatic representatives to Bulgaria resided in Belgrade and Bucharest from July 1955 until April 1970. India opened its embassy in Sofia in May 1970.

Indira Gandhi became the first Indian Prime Minister to visit Bulgaria in October 1967. Todor Zhivkov was the first Bulgarian Prime Minister to visit India in January 1969. Gandhi visited Bulgaria again in 1981. Presidents V.V. Giri visited Bulgaria in 1976, Sanjiva Reddy in 1980, S. D. Sharma in 1994, and A.P.J. Abdul Kalam in 2003. Bulgarian President Todor Zhivkov visited India in 1976 and 1983, and President Peter Stoyanov visited in 1998. Prime Minister Stanko Todorov visited India in 1974 and 1980, and Prime Minister Sergei Stanishev visited in 2007.

The first bilateral protocol for trade exchange was signed between the two countries in New Delhi on 16 September 1956, and the first agreement for economic, scientific and technical cooperation was signed in Sofia on 2 May 1967. A Joint Commission for Economic, Scientific & Technical Cooperation (with sub-branches for machine-building, electronics, agriculture, chemistry, defense industry, food industry, etc.) was established in November 1973. In 1975, the first cultural agreement between Bulgaria and India was signed.

In 2020, Bulgarian prime minister Boyko Borissov recorded a video message to Indian prime minister Narendra Modi on the occasion of International Yoga Day.

Bilateral trade between Bulgaria and India totaled $338.09 million in 2018-19.

Bilateral Commercial and Economic Relations

Bilateral Treaties and Agreements
India and Bulgaria together signed agreements on Tourism, Avoidance of Double Taxation, Combating Organized Crime, International Terrorism and Illicit Trafficking in Narcotics and Psychotropic substances, Protocol on Foreign Office Consultations, Bilateral Investment Promotion and Protection Agreement, Air Services Agreement, Defence Cooperation, Science and Technology, Extradition, Cooperation in Youth Affairs and Sports, Information Technologies, Economic Cooperation, Treaty on Mutual Legal Assistance in Criminal Matters, Treaty on Mutual Legal Assistance in Civil and Commercial Matters, Treaty on the Transfer of Sentenced Persons, Protocol for Amending the Agreement for the Promotion and Protection of Investment, Protocol of Intent on Labour Relations, Employment and Social Security, Small and Medium-Sized Enterprises Development, abolition of visa requirement for holders of Diplomatic and Official Passports, Programme of Cooperation in the field of Science & Technology, Programme of Cooperation in the field of Health and Medicine and Programme for Cooperation in the Fields of Science, Education and Culture, Civil Nuclear Cooperation etc.

Cultural Relations 
Until 2020, the two countries has signed 17 Cultural Exchange Programmes and the last one was signed in New Delhi in March 2018 for the period 2018-20. The important milestone in developing literary relationship between India and Bulgaria was Nobel Prize winner Rabindranath Tagore’s visit to Bulgaria in 1926.
Indian classics like Ramayana, Mahabharata, Vedas, Upanishads, Bhagavat Gita and Panchatantra stories and modern authors like Prem Chand, Mulk Raj Anand, Amrita Pritam etc. are very popular among Bulgarians. Similarly, literary works of Bulgarian poets like Hristo Botev, Hristo Smyrensky, Nikola Vaptsarov are widely translated to Indian languages. Katya Tosheva, a Bulgarian practices Yoga, an ancient Indian exercise and mastered the Indian classical dances of Bharatnatyam, Kathak and Odissi.

As a part of the Centre for Eastern Languages and Cultures, Sofia University has an Indology Department. To promote the implementation of Indology in diverse ways and at different levels, East-West Indological Foundation was established in 1997. Indian embassy in Bulgaria actively organizes a number of high profile cultural events.

See also 
Foreign relations of Bulgaria 
Foreign relations of India
Embassy of India, Sofia
India–European Union relations

References 

 
India
Bilateral relations of India